Bahía Tortugas Airfield  is a public paved airstrip located north of Bahía Tortugas, in the Municipality of Mulegé, Baja California Sur state, Mexico

Bahía Tortugas is a fishing town located on the Pacific Ocean coast.

Air taxi service

External links
Baja Bush Pilots forum about Bahía Tortugas
Nonstop to Wild Goats.

Airports in Baja California Sur
Mulegé Municipality